Captain Evan Baillie Fraser of Balconie was the son of Alexander Fraser of Inchcoulter/Balconie who founded the modern town of Evanton, naming it after his son. Evan married Christine Nicol in 1838 who bore him children: Alexander Thomas (1839), John Thomas (1842) and Elma (1843).  He became a Collector of Stamps with the Excise Service.

The Reverend Thomas Munro, minister of Kiltearn, writing in the 1840s lists him among five landowners in the parish of Kiltearn at the time, and tells us that "all of them, except Captain Fraser, [are] non-resident in the parish".   The new village was partly a convenient way of absorbing the numbers of people in the parish who were being evicted to make way for sheep, a process which was part of the historical phenomenon known as the Highland Clearances. By the 1840s, the process meant that Evanton had a population of 500 people, more than a quarter of the population of the parish, which was 1800.

See also

Balconie Castle

Notes

References
 Uncles, Christopher J., Easter Ross and the Black Isle, (Ochiltree, 1998)
 Munro, Rev. Thomas, "Kiltearn, County of Ross and Cromarty (1834-45)" in the Statistical Account of 1834-45, vol.14, pp. 313–32
 Evanton Oral History (1992)
 Alex Dow - family research letter May 2007

People from Ross and Cromarty
Year of birth missing
Year of death missing